JSW Ispat Steel Ltd (JISL)  was set up as Nippon Denro Ispat Limited in May 1984 by founding chairman M. L. Mittal. The company has operations in iron, steel, mining, energy and infrastructure. It is listed on the Bombay Stock Exchange and National Stock Exchange of India. Ispat Industries was ranked 5th among major next to Tata steel and JSW steel companies in India for the year 2008 by Business World. It is headquartered in Mumbai and employs about 3,000 people.

History
Nippon Denro Ispat Limited was incorporated in 1984 and was granted the first Industrial License by the Government of India for manufacturing Galvanised Plain/Corrugated Sheets. IIL was set up as a cold rolling reversing mill, in collaboration with Hitachi Ltd. of Japan, to manufacture a wide range of cold rolled carbon steel strips. In 1988 it installed a colour coating line and was granted Industrial License for Cold Rolled Sheets. In 1994  Business interests within the Group were demarcated. The eldest son, Mr. L N Mittal continued managing the international operations while Mr. Pramod Mittal and Mr. Vinod Mittal, the younger brothers focused on steel and other businesses in India. In 1994, it commissioned the world's largest gas-based single mega module plant for manufacturing direct reduced iron (sponge iron), at its Maharashtra-based Dolvi plant. In 1995 hot strip mill with Continuous Strip Processing (CSP) technology was installed at Dolvi. In 1998, integrated steel plant for the production of hot rolled coils was launched, using technologies such as the Conarc Process for steel making and the Compact Strip Process. Year 2000 saw the erection and commissioning of a 2 MTPA blast furnace at the Dolvi steel complex. Sponge iron capacity was increased from 1.2 MTPA to 1.4 MTPA in the year 2003. Year 2004 saw the increase in capacity of Hot rolled coil from 1.5 MTPA to 2.4 MTPA and Sponge iron from 1.4 MTPA to 1.6 MTPA.

Company 
JSW Ispat Steel has two integrated steel plants, located at Dolvi and Kalmeshwar in the state of Maharashtra. The  Dolvi complex houses the 30 lakh tonne per annum hot rolled coils plant, which combines the latest technologies – the Conarc process for steel making and the compact strip process (CSP) – introduced in Asia.

Major units

Integrated Steel Plant at Dolvi, Maharashtra 
The Dolvi complex has a captive port located close to it on the Amba River, which opens into the Arabian Sea. This port can handle barges and mini-bulk carriers up to 4,000 Dead Weight Tonnage (DWT). Moreover, a jetty adjoining the complex is capable of handling cargo of up to 1 crore (10 million) tonnes per annum.

Manufacturing Facilities:
 DRI – Sponge Iron Plant
 Blast Furnace
 Compact Strip Production

Integrated Steel Plant at Kalmeshwar, Maharashtra 
The integrated steel plant at Kalmeshwar uses the latest steel manufacturing technology to produce galvanised sheets and products, apart from cold rolled coils. The Kalmeshwar complex houses a total of three advanced plants – a 3.25 lakh tonnes Galvanised Plain/Galvanised Corrugated plant, a 3.3 lakh tonne Cold Rolled Coils plant and a 60,000 tonne Colour Coated Sheets plant.

Manufacturing Facilities
 Cold rolling mill
 Galvanising line
 Colour coating line

Takeover by JSW Steel
On 21 December 2010 it was declared that JSW Steel will buy controlling interest in Ispat Industries at an enterprise value of $3 billion to emerge as India's largest private producer of the steel with an annual capacity of 1.43 crore (14.3 million) tonnes. In June 2012,  the complete merger of JSW Steel and JSW Ispat steel has been completed.

See also

References

External links
 Ispat Industries Ltd. corporate website

Steel companies of India
Companies established in 1984
Companies based in Maharashtra
JSW Group
1984 establishments in Maharashtra
Companies listed on the National Stock Exchange of India
Companies listed on the Bombay Stock Exchange